Nick Fiorucci is a Canadian electronic and dance music DJ, songwriter, remixer, producer, and founder of record label Hi-Bias Records, and founder and owner of zipDJ, subscription-based digital music pool. Fiorucci has done production and remix work for artists, including Britney Spears, Katy Perry, Celine Dion, Sam Smith, TLC, Eiffel 65, Laura Pausini, ATB and Michelle Branch. In 1999, Nick was the youngest person introduced into the Canadian Dance Music Hall of Fame.

Fiorucci is the acting Chairman of the Juno Award Dance Music committee for Canadian Academy of Recording Arts and Sciences.

Education
Fiorucci graduated from Trebas Institute, with an Audio Engineer Diploma in the recording arts and sciences.

Career

Fiorucci began his career as a DJ in the 80s and started his own record labels Big Shot Records in 1988 and Hi-Bias Records in 1990. By the late '90s, he became one of the prominent after mixers and producers of electronic dance music.

Fiorucci was a part of the group called Temperance from mid-1997, after Mark Ryan parted ways with the group, after launching a music production imprint titled 22 Green, he became the songwriter and producer of Temperance.

As a DJ, Fiorucci has appeared in clubs such as Ministry of Sound, and has done opening performances for acts such as New Order, among others. He opened Lobby, a restaurant with Reza Abedi in Toronto.

Discography

Studio albums

Singles

Awards and recognitions

In 1994, Fiorucci won Juno Award for Dance Recording of the Year for Red Light's (Miguel Graça and Robert Ouimet's) song named "Thankful". In November 1998, he received a No. 1 plaque awarded by Society of Composers, Authors and Music Publishers of Canada at The Left Bank in Toronto.

In 2004, as an artist and producer, he won Urban Music Awards in the category "Dance Electronic Recording of The Year" for the song named "Make You Love Me", done together with Carlo Coppola. In 2008, he was nominated for Juno Award for his song "Every Time You Move". In 2018, he won Juno Award for his "Closer ft. Laurell".

See also

 List of electronic musicians

References

External links
 Personal website
 

Living people
Canadian DJs
Canadian dance musicians
Canadian electronic musicians
Juno Award for Dance Recording of the Year winners
Musicians from Toronto
Year of birth missing (living people)